Yankee Pluck is a 1917 American silent drama film directed by George Archainbaud and starring Ethel Clayton, Montagu Love, and Johnny Hines.

Cast
 Ethel Clayton as Polly Pollard 
 Edward Langford as Lieutenant Richard Travers 
 Johnny Hines as Lieutenant Tommy Patterson 
 Montagu Love as Baron Wootchi 
 Eric Wayne as George Henry Singleton 
 Charles Bowser as John Pollard 
 Isette Monroe as Mrs. Madison Derwent

References

Bibliography
 Donald W. McCaffrey & Christopher P. Jacobs. Guide to the Silent Years of American Cinema. Greenwood Publishing, 1999.

External links
 

1917 films
1917 drama films
1910s English-language films
American silent feature films
Silent American drama films
Films directed by George Archainbaud
American black-and-white films
World Film Company films
Films shot in Fort Lee, New Jersey
1910s American films